Metallic fibers are manufactured fibers composed of metal, metallic alloys, plastic-coated metal, metal-coated plastic, or a core completely covered by metal.

Having their origin in textile and clothing applications, gold and silver fibers have been used since ancient times as yarns for fabric decoration. More recently, aluminium yarns, aluminized plastic yarns, and aluminized nylon yarns have replaced gold and silver.

Today's metal fiber industry mainly offers fibers in stainless steel, nickel, titanium, copper and aluminium for various applications. Metallic filaments can be coated with transparent films to minimize tarnishing.

Metal fiber may also be shaved from wire (steel wool), shaven from foil, bundle drawn from larger diameter wire, machined from an ingot, cast from molten metal, or grown around a seed (often carbon).

History
Gold and silver have been used since ancient times as decoration in the clothing and textiles of kings, leaders, nobility and people of status. Many of these elegant textiles can be found in museums around the world. Historically, the metallic thread was constructed by wrapping a metal strip around a fiber core (cotton or silk), often in such a way as to reveal the color of the fiber core to enhance visual quality of the decoration. Ancient textiles and clothing woven from wholly or partly gold threads is sometimes referred to as cloth of gold. They have been woven on Byzantine looms from the 7th to the 9th century, and after that in Sicily, Cyprus, Lucca, and Venice. Weaving also flourished in the 12th century during the legacy of Genghis Khan when art and trade flourished under Mongol rule in China and some Middle Eastern areas. The Dobeckmum Company produced the first modern metallic fiber in 1946.

During the early 1960s, Brunswick Corp. conducted a research program to develop an economically viable process for forming metallic filaments. They started producing metallic filaments in a laboratory-scale pilot plant. By 1964 Brunswick was producing fine metal fibers as small as 1 μm from 304 type stainless steel. Their first large scale production facility, located in the US, was brought on stream in 1966. Metal fibers are now widely produced and used in all kinds of technology. With a wide range of applications, it is a mature sector.

In the past, aluminium was often the base in a metallic fiber. More recently stainless steel has become the dominant metal for metallic fibers. Depending on the alloy, the metallic fibers provide properties to the yarn which allow the use in more high tech applications.

Fiber properties
Metal fibers exists in different forms and diameters. Generally, the sector offers metal fiber diameters from 100μm down to 1μm.

Metallic fibers exists in both long, continuous fibers as well as short fibers (with a length/diameter ratio of less than 100).

Compared to other fiber types, like carbon, glass, aramid or natural fibers, metal fibers have a low electrical resistance. This makes them suitable for any application that requires electrical conductivity. Their excellent thermal resistance makes them withstand extreme temperatures. Corrosion resistance is achieved through the use of high-quality alloys in stainless steels or other metals. Other advantageous mechanical properties of metal fibers include high failure strain, ductility, shock resistance, fire resistance and sound insulation.

Sintered metal fiber structures and products display high porosity properties, while remaining structurally strong and durable. This benefits the function and structure of specific applications like filtration or electrodes.

Coated metallic filaments helps to minimize tarnishing. When suitable adhesives and films are used, they are not affected by salt water, chlorinated water in swimming pools or climatic conditions. If possible anything made with metallic fibers should be dry-cleaned, if there is no care label. Ironing can be problematic because the heat from the iron, especially at high temperatures, can melt the fibers.

Production method
There are several processes which can be used for manufacturing metallic fibers.

The most common technology is known as bundle drawing. Several thousands of filaments are bundled together in a so-called composite wire, a tube which is drawn through a die to further reduce its diameter. The covering tube is later dissolved in acid, resulting in individual continuous metal fibers. This composite wire is drawn further until the desired diameter of the individual filaments within the bundle is obtained. Bundle drawing technology allows for the production of continuous metal fiber bundles with lengths of up to several kilometers. Due to the nature of the process, the cross-section of the fibers is octagonal. In order to achieve high-quality fibers, this technology can be fine-tuned, resulting in uniform, very thin fibers with a very narrow equivalent diameter spread. Special developments within the last couple of years have allowed this technology to be used for the production of fibers with diameters as small as 200 nm and below.

In the laminating process, one seals a layer of aluminium between two layers of acetate or polyester film. These fibers are then cut into lengthwise strips for yarns and wound onto bobbins. The metal can be colored and sealed in a clear film, the adhesive can be colored, or the film can be colored before laminating. There are many different variations of color and effect that can be made in metallic fibers, producing a wide range of looks.

With foil-shaving technology, fibers with diameters down to 14 μm and a more rectangular crosssection are feasible. This produces semicontinuous bundles of fibers or staple fibers.

Machining of staple fibers can produce semicontinuous bundles of fibers down to 10 μm. Improving staple fiber manufacturing allows a narrow diameter spread on these kinds of fibers as well as tuning of the geometry of the fiber. This technology is unique compared to foil shaving or fibers from melt spinning, due to the small diameters that can be reached and the relatively small diameter spread

Metallic fibers can also be made by using the metalizing process. This process involves heating the metal until it vaporizes then depositing it at a high pressure onto the polyester film . This process produces thinner, more flexible, more durable, and more comfortable fibers.

Metal fiber may also be shaved from wire (steel wool), cast from molten metal, or grown around a seed (often carbon).

Types of metallic fiber products  

Sintered media

Metal fibers are converted into fiber media either as non-woven fleece or sintered structures composed of fibers ranging from 1.5 to 80 μm in diameter. These porous metal fiber media have been used for their uniqueness in highly demanding applications. The benefit of having the combination of an outstanding permeable material (porosities up to 90% for sintered and up to 99% for non-woven structures) combined with high corrosion and temperature resistance is highly valued. The sintered porous structure has no binder as the individual fibers are strongly bonded together by inter-metallic diffusion bonding. 3D sintered structures have also become a standard product. Some of the latest developments are relate to filtration media using a combination of metallic and non-metallic fibers, allowing the best of both worlds. Short fibers

A specially designed process allows the production of individual powder-like metal fibers known as short fibers with a length over diameter (L/D) range of 100. These short fibers can be used as such or in combination with metal powders to produce sintered filtration structures with ultra-high levels of filtration while allowing unique levels of permeability. 

Polymer pellets

Other metal fiber products are polymer pellets or grains composed out of metal fibers. Several bundles of fibers are glued together with a variety of sizings and an adequate compatible extrusion coating is applied. After chopping these coated bundles into pellets they can be used as additives in the production of engineered conductive/ shielding plastic pieces by injection molding and extrusion. The unique benefit of metal fibers is the conductive network formation with a relatively limited volume of conductive additives. 

Non-wovens

Non-wovens or felts can be produced with metal fibers, just like with traditional textile fibers. In a very limited number of cases, needle punching can be applied to entangle the fibers and obtain needle-punched felt. 

Yarns

A bundle of endless stainless steel fibers can be converted to yarns by textile spinning processes. There are two forms of yarn: one with a low amount of fibers and one with a high amount of fibers. The former, with a number of filaments of around 275, can be converted into a filament yarn by adding twist to the bundle. Bundles with several thousands of fibers are typically used to convert fibers into spun yarn. That can be done by stretch breaking and subsequent traditional yarn spinning technologies. This results in 100% metal yarns. During the spinning process, tows can be blended and blended yarns can also be produced. Blends with cotton, polyester and wool are possible. Subsequently, metal yarns can be further converted into various textile products using textile processes. Knitting (circular, flat, warp) and weaving are possible, as well as braiding. Blended textile products can be obtained by combining metal yarns with other yarns, or by using yarns that have two kinds of fibers inside and hence are already blends by themselves. 

Electrical cables

To make cables, two or more filaments are twisted together a number of times. During the process, a cable's torsion and straightness are monitored. The cable can be fine-tuned for a certain application by combining different filament strengths, diameters or the number of twists, or by preforming. Fiber Reinforced Composites

Metal fiber can be used as reinforcement fiber for composite materials, improving breaking behavior upon impact and electrical conductivity. Traditional carbon or glass fiber reinforcement fibers have very limited elongation possibilities, which results in a brittle and explosive breaking behavior. Metal fibers act perfectly complementary to this, and can absorb much more energy before breaking. Processing is no different from any other reinforcement fiber for composite material. It is even possible to combine metal fibers with other fibers into a 'hybrid' composite structure, which combines all the benefits of carbon, glass and steel.

Producers
Currently metallic fibers are manufactured primarily in Europe. The largest and most integrated metal fiber producer worldwide is the multinational company Bekaert, headquartered in Belgium, but with manufacturing footprint in Europe, Asia and the Americas. Three manufacturers are still producing metallic yarn in the United States. Metlon Corporation is one of the remaining manufacturers in the U.S. that stocks a wide variety of laminated and non-laminated metallic yarns & Brightex Corporation, Reiko. Co of Japan and South Korea, such as Hwa Young, is also manufacturing Metallic fibers.
China also produces metallic yarns; the city Dongyang contains more than 100 factories, though some of these are home based production sites rather than conventional factories. Two of the more popular factories are Salu Metallic Yarn and Aoqi Textile.

In 2020, Fibrecoat a German start-up from Aachen started producing Aluminium coated Basalt Fibres in Germany, their patented coating technique allows for an exponential increase in production speed, and decrease in process steps, energy consumption and price.

Trademarks
Bekaert manufactures metal fibers and many derived products such as continuous fiber, sintered media, nonwoven structures, polymer pellets, braids, woven fabrics, cables, yarns and short fibers. Well established brand names are Bekipor, Beki-shield and Bekinox.

The Lurex Company has manufactured metallic fibers in Europe for over fifty years. They produce a wide variety of metallic fiber products including fibers used in apparel fabric, embroidery, braids, knitting, military regalia, trimmings, ropes, cords, and lace surface decoration. The majority of Lurex fibers have a polyamide film covering the metal strand but polyester and viscose are also used. The fibers are also treated with a lubricant called P.W., a mineral-based oil, which helps provide ease of use.

Metlon Corporation is a trademark of Metallic Yarns in the United States and has been producing metallic yarns for over sixty years. Metlon produces their metallic yarn by wrapping single slit yarns with two ends of nylon. One end of nylon is wrapped clockwise and the other end is wrapped counterclockwise around the metallic yarn. The most commonly used nylon is either 15 denier or 20 denier, but heavier deniers are used for special purposes.

Uses
Metallic fibers are used in a wide range of sectors and segments.

Automotive

Metal fiber sintered sheets are used for diesel and gasoline particulate filtration and crankcase ventilation filters.

Heat-resistant textile materials are made from metal fibers for automotive glass bending processes. These metal fiber cloths protect the glass during the bending process with highly elevated temperatures and high pressures.

Also heating cables for car seat heating and Selective Catalytic Reduction tubes, adblue tanks. Metal fiber heating cables show an extremely high flexibility and durability when compared to copper wire.

Aerospace

Metal fiber filters are used for Hydraulic fluid filtration in aircraft hydraulic systems. When compared to glass fiber filtration media, metal fibers show excellent durability, as the fibers are metallically bonded together by sintering, instead of kept together by a binder material.

Metal fiber sintered porous sheets are used as a sound attenuation medium in the aircraft cabin, reducing HVAC sounds, and auxiliary power unit noise.

Technical textiles

Metal fibers can serve as antistatic fibers for textiles, which can be used in, amongst others, electrical protective clothing or antistatic big bags.

Not only antistatic, but also shielding from electromagnetic interference (EMI) can be achieved by metal fiber textiles.

Stainless steel fiber textiles can be heated by applying electrical current and can also be used for cut resistant clothing (gloves).

Power

Metal fiber filters can reach very high porosity, at very low pore sizes, which makes them suitable for HEPA and ULPA filtration. These filters are used in, amongst others, nuclear power plants as a safety measure to prevent eventual release of radio-active steam.

Marine

Metal fiber filters are used for the purification of marine fuel and lube oil.

Other uses of metal fibers

Another common use for metallic fibers is upholstery fabric and textiles such as lamé and brocade. Many people also use metallic fibers in weaving and needlepoint. Increasingly common today are metallic fibers in clothing, anything from party and evening wear to club clothing, cold weather and survival clothing, and everyday wear. Metallic yarns are woven, braided, and knit into many fashionable fabrics and trims. For additional variety, metallic yarns are twisted with other fibers such as wool, nylon, cotton, and synthetic blends to produce yarns which add novelty effects to the end cloth or trim.

Stainless steel and other metal fibers are used in communication lines such as phone lines and cable television lines.

Stainless steel fibers are also used in carpets. They are dispersed throughout the carpet with other fibers so they are not detected. The presence of the fibers helps to conduct electricity so that the static shock is reduced. These types of carpets are often used in computer-use areas or other areas where static build-up could damage equipment. Other uses include tire cord, missile nose cones, work clothing such as protective suits, space suits, and cut resistant gloves for butchers and other people working near bladed or dangerous machinery.

Metal fibers can be used as a reinforcement or electrical conductivity fiber for fiber reinforced composites.

References

Synthetic fibers
Technical fabrics